The International Journal of Conflict and Violence (IJCV) is an open access interdisciplinary scientific journal covering conflict and violence research. It has been published twice a year in English since 2007 and encompasses contributions from a wide range of disciplines including sociology, political science, education, social psychology, criminology, ethnology, history, political philosophy, urban studies, economics, and the study of religions.

The editors-in-chief are Andreas Zick (University of Bielefeld), Steven F. Messner, (University at Albany, SUNY), Gary LaFree, (University of Maryland, College Park) and Ekaterina Stepanova (IMEMO, Russian Academy of Sciences) and is sponsored by the Institute for Interdisciplinary Research on Conflict and Violence (Institut für interdisziplinäre Konflikt- und Gewaltforschung, IKG) and the German Research Foundation (Deutsche Forschungsgemeinschaft, DFG).

Abstracting and indexing 
The journal is abstracted and indexed in:

 DNB
 EBSCOhost
 ISI: Social Sciences Citation Index
 ProQuest
 SCOPUS

According to the Journal Citation Reports, the journal has a 2014 impact factor of 0.578, ranking it 98th out of 161 journals in the category "Political Science" and 50th out of 85 journals in the category "International Relations".

See also 
 List of international relations journals
 List of political science journals

Notes

External links 
Journal home page

Biannual journals
International relations journals
Publications established in 1998
Violence journals